Orange Caramel is the debut (second overall) Japanese studio album by South Korean girl group After School sub-unit Orange Caramel. It was released on March 13, 2013 by Avex Trax. The album was preceded by the singles "Yasashii Akuma" and "Lipstick/Lamu no Love Song".

Singles
"Yasashii Akuma" (やさしい悪魔), also known as "My Sweet Devil", was the first single released in Japan by the group. The song is a remake of 1970's pop group Candies' song "Yasashii Akuma". The B-side is a Japanese version of their Korean debut single, "Magic Girl". The single was released on September 5, 2012, peaking on the Oricon Weekly Chart at #10.

"Lipstick/Lamu no Love Song" was the dual-second single released in Japan. "Lipstick" is a Japanese remake of the Korean single from their first Korean album Lipstick. "Lamu no Love Song" is a cover of the opening theme for the popular anime series Urusei Yatsura. The song was released on December 12, 2012 and peaked on the Oricon Weekly Chart at #12.

Track listing

Note: the digital track list is inconsistent. On Amazon Music, it includes all of the tracks, but on Spotify, the Japanese version of Lipstick, Lamu no Love Song, My Sweet Devil, and the Japanese version of Magic Girl are excluded.

Chart performance

Weekly charts

References

External links
 Orange Caramel Website

2013 albums
Japanese-language albums
Avex Group albums
Orange Caramel albums